Edwin Joseph Cohn (December 17, 1892 – October 1, 1953) was a protein scientist. A graduate of Phillips Academy, Andover [1911], and the University of Chicago [1914, PhD 1917], he made important advances in the physical chemistry of proteins, and was responsible for the blood fractionation project that saved thousands of lives in World War II.

Liver juice fractionation and concentration for treatment of pernicious anemia

In 1928, as group leader at Harvard Medical School, Cohn was able to concentrate, by a factor of 50 to 100 times, the vital factor in raw liver juice which had been shown by Minot and Murphy to be the only known specific treatment for pernicious anemia.
Cohn's contribution allowed practical treatment of this previously incurable and fatal illness, for the next 20 years.

Blood fractionation project

Cohn became famous for his work on blood fractionation during World War II.  
In particular, he worked out the techniques for isolating the serum albumin fraction of blood plasma, which is essential for maintaining the osmotic pressure in the blood vessels, preventing their collapse.  Transfusions with purified albumin on the battlefield rescued thousands of soldiers from shock.

After the war, Cohn worked to develop systems by which every component of donated blood would be used, so that nothing would be wasted.
 
On Cohn's office blackboard was inscribed a quotation from Goethe's Faust: "Das Blut ist ein ganz besonderer Saft." (Blood is a very special juice.)

Physical chemistry of proteins

Cohn is also well-remembered for his studies of the physical chemistry of proteins, particularly his general "salting out" equation for protein solubility (1925)

This equation is identical to the Setschenow solubility equation (Setschenow, 1889).

Cohn was a long-time collaborator and friend of another important physical chemist, George Scatchard.

A most important book

In 1943, Cohn and John Edsall published Proteins, Amino Acids and Peptides, a book that summarized the known physical chemistry of proteins and deeply influenced succeeding generations of protein scientists.

Personality

Cohn was an excellent project leader, being driven, ambitious, and extremely well organized.  He also had a keen taste in people and scientific projects and could sense when either would be successful. The success of the blood fractionation project was due in great part to his management, and he can be considered responsible for saving thousands of lives.

Cohn was also selfless in the best (and worst) scientific tradition. For example, he would often give public demonstrations of the blood  fractionation machine, in which he would fractionate his own blood on the stage during the lecture. In one such lecture, at the Instituto Superior Técnico in Lisbon, the machine  became blocked (without Cohn's knowledge) and exploded, showering the first few rows of the audience with Cohn's blood.  Cohn maintained his sangfroid, however, and continued his lecture without significant interruption. More generally, Cohn drove himself relentlessly and ignored his doctors' advice to cut back on working because of his high blood pressure (which finally killed him).

However, Cohn was also well known for being harsh and demanding of his subordinates, being something of a martinet.

Historical dates

Edwin J. Cohn was born on December 17, 1892 in New York City to Abraham and Maimie Einstein Cohn.

Cohn was elected to the American Academy of Arts and Sciences in 1926, the United States National Academy of Sciences in 1943, and the American Philosophical Society in 1949.

Cohn died on October 1, 1953 in Boston, of a stroke brought on by hypertension caused by an undiagnosed pheochromocytoma.

References

 Cohn EJ. (1925) "The Physical Chemistry of the Proteins", Physiol. Rev., 5, 349-437.
 Cohn EJ and Edsall JT. (1943) Proteins, Amino Acids and Peptides as Ions and Dipolar Ions, Reinhold Publishing, New York.
 Starr D. (1998) Blood: An Epic History of Medicine and Commerce, Quill. 
 Surgenor DM (2002) Edwin Cohn and the Development of Protein Chemistry, Center for Blood Research and Harvard Medical School. 
 Cohen FS. (2003) "Book Review: Edwin Cohn and the Development of Protein Chemistry", New England Journal of Medicine, 349, 511-512.
 Setschenow (1889) "Über die Konstitution der Salzlösungen auf Grund ihres Verhaltens zu Kohlensäure", Zeitschrift für Physikalische Chemie, 4, 117-125.

External links
 PBS biography written by John Tileston Edsall
Edwin J. Cohn papers, 1927-1955 (inclusive), HMS c375. Harvard Medical Library, Francis A. Countway Library of Medicine, Center for the History of Medicine, Harvard Medical School

1892 births
1953 deaths
Scientists from New York City
American biochemists
University of Chicago alumni
Harvard University people
American physical chemists
Members of the American Philosophical Society